Millington may refer to:

Places
In the United Kingdom:
Millington, East Riding of Yorkshire
Millington, Cheshire

In the United States:
Millington, Connecticut
Millington, Illinois
Millington, Maryland
Millington, Michigan
Millington Township, Michigan
Millington, New Jersey
Millington, Oregon
Millington, Tennessee

Other uses
Millington (surname)
 Millington Glacier, glacier, Antarctica
 Millington Motor Car Company, former United States automobile company
 Millington and Sons, former English stationery company, 1918 bought by John Dickinson & Co. Ltd